Zarabad (also Romanized as Zarābād) is a village in Moallem Kalayeh Rural District, Rudbar-e Alamut District, Qazvin County, Qazvin Province, Iran. At the 2006 census, its population was 342, in 129 families.  Zarabad is located on Ovan Lake.

References 

Populated places in Qazvin County